Frank Bush (born January 10, 1963) is a former American football linebacker and coach who is the linebackers coach for the Atlanta Falcons of the National Football League (NFL). He was drafted by the Houston Oilers in the fifth round of the 1985 NFL Draft. He played college football at North Carolina State.

Playing career
Bush was drafted by the Houston Oilers in the fifth round of the 1985 NFL Draft. As a rookie, he started 11 of 16 games recording three sacks. During his second season in 1986 he started the first three games of the season when an examination following an injury, revealed that he had a narrow spinal canal.  This condition, not caused by play, made it too risky for him to continue playing.

Coaching career

Houston Oilers
In 1987, Bush was hired by the Oilers to be their college scout and he remained at the position until 1992 when he was promoted to linebackers coach. He served as the team's linebackers coach until 1994.

Denver Broncos
From 1995 to 1999 Bush served as the Denver Broncos linebackers coach under Mike Shanahan and was a member of the teams back-to-back Super Bowl victories over the Green Bay Packers in Super Bowl XXXII and Atlanta Falcons in Super Bowl XXXIII. In 2000, he served as the secondary/nickel package coach and was the special teams coach from 2001 to 2003.

Arizona Cardinals
From 2004 to 2006, Bush served as linebackers coach for the Arizona Cardinals under Dennis Green. Along with being the linebackers coach in 2006, he was also the assistant head coach to Green.

Houston Texans
From 2007 to 2008, Bush served as the Houston Texans’ senior defensive assistant under head coach Gary Kubiak. Before the 2009 season, Bush was promoted to defensive coordinator. He was fired at the end of the 2010 season after the Texans finished third-to-last in the NFL in total defense.

Tennessee Titans
On February 16, 2011, Bush was hired as the new linebacker coach of the Tennessee Titans.

St. Louis/Los Angeles Rams
Bush spent four seasons as linebackers coach for the St. Louis/Los Angeles Rams, from 2013 to 2016.

Miami Dolphins
On January 19, 2017, Bush was hired as assistant head coach and linebackers coach of the Miami Dolphins, after Matt Burke was promoted to defensive coordinator a week before as the replacement for Vance Joseph, who left to become head coach of the Denver Broncos.

New York Jets
On February 8, 2019 The New York Jets hired Bush as their inside linebackers coach. Following a loss to the Las Vegas Raiders in the final seconds of their Week 13 matchup, defensive coordinator Gregg Williams was fired with Bush taking his place.

Atlanta Falcons
on January 22, 2021, the Atlanta Falcons hired Bush to be their linebackers coach.

References

1963 births
Living people
American football linebackers
Arizona Cardinals coaches
Atlanta Falcons coaches
Coaches of American football from Georgia (U.S. state)
Denver Broncos coaches
Houston Oilers coaches
Houston Oilers players
Houston Texans coaches
National Football League defensive coordinators
NC State Wolfpack football players
Miami Dolphins coaches
Players of American football from Georgia (U.S. state)
Sportspeople from Athens, Georgia
St. Louis Rams coaches
Tennessee Titans coaches